Sauerbrunn or Sauerbrun may refer to:

Locations

Austria
 Sauerbrunn Castle (das ) nearby Pöls, Styria, Austria
 A mineral water from Obladis, Landeck District, Tyrol, Austria
 Bad Sauerbrunn (until 1987 simply Sauerbrunn), the name of a mineral spa and the town

Czech Republic
 Gießhübl-Sauerbrunn, German name of Kyselka, Czech Republic

Poland
 German name of a district in Szczawina, Glatzer Land, Silesia

People
 Becky Sauerbrunn (born 1985), American soccer player
 Karl Drais (1785–1851), German inventor, also known as Charles de Sauerbrun (Sauerbronn), Baron von Drais
 Todd Sauerbrun (born 1973), American football player